Xiaowandong is a town in Nanjian Yi Autonomous County, Yunnan, China.

Administrative division
As of 2018, the town is divided into seven villages: 
 Shenzhou
 Yingpan
 Longjie
 Xinlong
 Xinmin
 Longmen
 Chajiang

History
During the Great Leap Forward, it known as "Chajiang Commune" in 1958.  It was upgraded to a town in 1988.

Geography
The town is located in the southwest of Nanjian Yi Autonomous County, bordering Fengqing County and Yun County to the southwest, and Gonglang Town and Bixi Township to the northeast.

The Lancang River and Heihui River meet in the town.

Economy
The local economy is primarily based upon agriculture and animal husbandry. Economic crops are mainly tobacco, tea, Juglans sigillata, and persimmon.

Demographics

As of 2020, the National Bureau of Statistics of China estimates the town's population now to be 18,431.

Transportation
Dali–Lincang railway: Xiaowan East railway station, opened November 6, 2021.

References

Bibliography

Divisions of Nanjian Yi Autonomous County